"These Are the Days" is a song by American boy band O-Town. It was written by David Frank, Steve Kipner, and Wayne Hector, and produced by Frank and Kipner for their second studio album O2 (2002). The song was released as the album's lead single and became a top 20 hit in Canada.

Background
"These Are the Days" was written by David Frank, Steve Kipner, and Wayne Hector, and produced by Frank and Kipner for O-Town second studio album O2. In April 2002, MTV News reported that "I Showed Her" was initially planned to be released as the album's lead single.

Music video
A music video for the song was directed by Marc Webb.

Track listing

Notes
 signifies a co-producer

Personnel and credits 
Credits adapted from the liner notes of O2.

	
Tom Coyne – mastering engineer
Terence Eliot – guitar
Erik Michael Estrada – vocals
David Frank – instruments, producer, writer
Ryan Freeland – engineer
Steve Kipner – producer, writer

Wayne Hector – writer
Dan Miller – vocals
Ashley Parker Angel – vocals
Trevor Penick – vocals
Paul Pesco – guitar
Jacob Underwood – vocals

Charts

Release history

References

2002 singles
2002 songs
O-Town songs
J Records singles